Agent (The Mole), or Agent – Gwiazdy (The Mole – Stars), is the Polish version of the Belgian reality competition television series, De Mol.

History
The first season premiered on TVN on October 29, 2000 and aired for three seasons. It was hosted by Marcin Meller. In 2016 the show returned, this time hosted by Kinga Rusin, and the first edition was filmed in South Africa; it premiered on February 23, 2016.

The second celebrity season, which was filmed in Argentina, premiered on February 14, 2017. The third celebrity season premiered on February 21, 2018 and was recorded in Hong Kong and on Bali island (Indonesia), making the Polish version only the third Mole version worldwide to stage a season in any Asian country (after the Dutch and Belgian, respectively).

Series overview

Seasons

Season 1 (2000)

Contestants

Season 2 (2001)

Contestants

Season 3 (2002)

Contestants

Season 4 (2016)

Celebrities 
The complete list of participants was revealed on 12 January 2016. Participation of Jabłczyńska, Maślak, Sieradzky, Szczawińska and Urbański was announced on 9 January 2016. On 11 January 2016, it was confirmed that Królikowski, Szpak and Tajner-Wiśniewska would join the line-up.

Termination chart 

 Indicates the player won the game
 Indicates the player was the mole
 Indicates the player won an exemption for the next quiz
 Indicates the player lost an exemption
 Indicates the player used freebies on the quiz to correct one or more wrong answers
 Indicates the player used one or more freebies on the quiz and was terminated
 Indicates the player scored the lowest on the quiz without holding any freebies or exemptions and was terminated
 Indicates that the player was originally eliminated, but was brought back because of the other players' votes

Season 5 (2017)

Celebrities 
The complete list of participants was revealed on 23 January 2017.

Termination chart 

 Indicates the player won the game
 Indicates the player was the mole
 Indicates the player won an exemption for the next quiz
 Indicates the player lost an exemption
 Indicates the player lost an exemption, but used one or more freebies (jokers) on the quiz to correct one or more wrong answers
 Indicates the player used freebies (jokers) on the quiz to correct one or more wrong answers
 Indicates the player used one or more freebies (jokers) on the quiz and was terminated
 Indicates the player used black freebies on the quiz and it invalidates all other freebies (jokers) used by the players on the test
 Indicates the player scored the lowest on the quiz without holding any freebies or exemptions and was terminated
 Indicates that the player was originally eliminated, but was brought back because of the other players' votes

Season 6 (2018)

Celebrities

Season 7 (2019)

Celebrities

References

External links 
 

The Mole (franchise)
TVN (Polish TV channel) original programming
Polish reality television series
Television shows filmed in France
Television shows filmed in Spain
Television shows filmed in Portugal
Television shows filmed in South Africa
Television shows filmed in Argentina
Television shows filmed in Hong Kong
Television shows filmed in Indonesia